The Museo Archeologico Ostiense (or Archaeological Museum of Ostia) is an archaeological museum dedicated to the ancient Roman city of Ostia in Rome, Italy.

The museum was built by Pope Pius IX, who in 1865 had to readapt a fifteenth-century building used as a store to create a city museum. Contained in the museum are numerous archaeological objects which came to light during a long period of excavations. The collection includes, for example, a collection of portraits of famous people from ancient Ostia, including philosophers and members of the royal family, such as busts depicting Asclepius and  Volcacius Myropnous, a portrait of Faustina the Elder and the head of Trajan. The museum also has a large collection of sculptures, including the statue of Perseus holding the head of Medusa, the sculptural group of Mithras slaying the bull, and other works. There are other examples on display of great interest, such as small groups in marble depicting Cupid and Psyche and other subjects, and in another section of the museum, sarcophagi and reliefs. On display are also examples of wall paintings from different burials and emblems of polychrome mosaics, such as the Christ Blessing. These works of great historical and artistic value, are then supported by a collection of minor works such as crafts, glass, and even teaches some at the shop, and some interesting facts, such as the marble slab found in the temple of Bellona, on which are carved two pairs of feet opposite, probably a votive object.

See also
 Ostia Antica

References

External links
 Museo Archeologico Ostiense official website 
 Ostia - Virtual Museum (photographs of objects found in Ostia and Portus)
 

Museums of ancient Rome in Italy
Art museums and galleries in Rome
Archaeological museums in Italy
Museum districts
1865 establishments in Italy
Museums established in 1865
National museums of Italy
Ostia (ancient city)